Terence Davies (born 10 November 1945) is an English screenwriter, film director, and novelist. He is best known as the writer and director of autobiographical films, including Distant Voices, Still Lives (1988), The Long Day Closes (1992) and the collage film, Of Time and the City (2008), as well as literature adaptations, such as The House of Mirth (2000).

Early years
Davies was born in Kensington, Liverpool, Merseyside, the youngest of ten children of working-class Catholic parents. Though he was raised Catholic by his deeply religious mother, at the age of 22 he rejected religion and considered himself an atheist. Davies' father, whom Terence remembers as "psychotic", died of cancer when Davies was seven years old. From then until he entered boarding school at the age of 11, he remembers as the four happiest years of his life.

Career
After leaving school at sixteen, Davies worked for ten years as a shipping office clerk and as an unqualified accountant, before leaving Liverpool to attend Coventry Drama School. While he was there, he wrote the screenplay for what became his first autobiographical short, Children (1976), filmed under the auspices of the BFI Production Board. After that introduction to film-making, Davies attended the National Film School, completing Madonna and Child (1980), a continuation of the story of Davies' alter ego, Robert Tucker, covering his years as a clerk in Liverpool. Three years later, he completed the trilogy with Death and Transfiguration (1983), in which he speculates about the circumstances of his death. Those works went on to be screened together at film festivals throughout Europe and North America as The Terence Davies Trilogy, winning numerous awards. Davies, who is gay, frequently explores gay themes in his films.

Davies' first two features, Distant Voices, Still Lives and The Long Day Closes, are autobiographical films, set in Liverpool in the 1940s and 1950s. In reviewing Distant Voices, Still Lives, Jonathan Rosenbaum wrote that "years from now when practically all the other new movies currently playing are long forgotten, it will be remembered and treasured as one of the greatest of all English films". In 2002, critics polled for Sight & Sound ranked Distant Voices, Still Lives as the ninth-best film of the previous 25 years. Jean-Luc Godard, often dismissive of British cinema in general, singled out Distant Voices, Still Lives as an exception, calling it "magnificent". The Long Day Closes was also praised by J. Hoberman as "Davies' most autobiographical and fully achieved work".

Davies' next two features, The Neon Bible and The House of Mirth, were adaptations of novels by John Kennedy Toole and Edith Wharton respectively. The House of Mirth received favourable reviews, with Film Comment naming it one of the ten best films of 2000. Gillian Anderson won Best Performance in the Second Annual Village Voice Film Critics' Poll and the film was named the third best film of 2000 in the same poll.

After completing The House of Mirth, Davies' intended fifth feature was Sunset Song, an adaptation of the novel by Lewis Grassic Gibbon. Financing proved difficult as Scottish and international backers left the project after the BBC, Channel 4 and the UK Film Council each rejected proposals for final funds. Davies apparently considered Kirsten Dunst for the lead role before the project was postponed. In the interim Davies produced two works for radio, A Walk to the Paradise Garden, an original radio play broadcast on BBC Radio 3 in 2001, and a two-part radio adaptation of Virginia Woolf's The Waves, broadcast on BBC Radio 4 in September 2007. The long interval between films ended with his first documentary Of Time and the City, which was premiered out of competition at the 2008 Cannes Film Festival. The work uses vintage newsreel footage, contemporary popular music and Davies' narration as a paean to Liverpool. It received positive reviews on its premiere.

The Deep Blue Sea, based on the play by Terence Rattigan, was commissioned by the Rattigan Trust. The film was met with widespread acclaim, with Rachel Weisz winning the New York Film Critics Circle Award for Best Actress and topping the Village Voice Film Critics' Poll for best lead female performance. Davies eventually found finance for Sunset Song in 2012 and it went into production in 2014. In October 2014 the film went into post-production. It was released in 2015. Davies' next film was A Quiet Passion, based on the life of the American poet Emily Dickinson. His 2021 film Benediction told the story of the British war poet Siegfried Sassoon.

Filmography

Bibliography

Awards and nominations

References

External links
 
 Terence Davies entry in film director database They Shoot Pictures, Don't They?
 
 
 Article on the collapse of "Sunset Song" project from timesonline.co.uk
 Terence Davies at Virtual History

English film directors
English dramatists and playwrights
English screenwriters
English male screenwriters
English radio writers
English atheists
LGBT film directors
English LGBT writers
1945 births
Living people
Collage filmmakers
British gay writers
British LGBT dramatists and playwrights
English male dramatists and playwrights
Alumni of the National Film and Television School